Rubén Amaro Jr. (born February 12, 1965) is an American former professional baseball outfielder and General manager (GM). He was named the GM of the Philadelphia Phillies on November 3, 2008, succeeding Pat Gillick and remained in that position until September 10, 2015. He was previously the first base coach for the Boston Red Sox (–) and New York Mets. He is the son of former MLB infielder and coach, Rubén Amaro Sr.

Amaro is currently a color commentator for the Philadelphia Phillie's television broadcast and a contributor the 94.1 WIP Morning Show in Philadelphia.

Early life
Born and raised in the Rhawnhurst neighborhood of Northeast Philadelphia, Amaro played Little League Baseball for Crispin Gardens. Amaro is Jewish; his mother Judy Amaro-Perez (née Herman) is of Russian-Jewish heritage and his father was a Catholic Mexican-Cuban.

Amaro graduated from William Penn Charter School in 1983, where he played baseball and soccer. He graduated from Stanford University in 1987. In 1985 and 1986, he played collegiate summer baseball with the Cotuit Kettleers of the Cape Cod Baseball League and was named an all-star both seasons. He was a member of the Stanford team that won the NCAA 1987 College World Series. He led the team in runs (77), triples (6), and stolen bases (38) that year.

Baseball playing career

Minor leagues

Drafted by the California Angels in the 11th round of the 1987 amateur draft, he signed June 16, 1987.

In 1989 he began the season by batting .360 for Quad Cities of the Midwest League, and then ended it by hitting .382 for the Midland of the Texas League. In 1990 he batted .317 between AA and AAA. He followed that by batting .326 in 1991 in AAA. In 3,117 at bats in the minor leagues, he batted .301 with a .399 on-base percentage and 235 stolen bases.

Major leagues
He debuted in the major leagues on June 8, 1991. On December 8, 1991, he was traded by the Angels with Kyle Abbott to the Philadelphia Phillies for Von Hayes.

In 1992 he finished third in the NL with 9 hit-by-pitches. On November 2, 1993, he was traded by the Phillies to the Cleveland Indians for Heathcliff Slocumb.

Amaro made the Cleveland Indians World Series roster in 1995 over Dave Winfield. On November 9, 1995, he was released by the Indians.

On January 24, 1996, he was signed as a free agent by the Toronto Blue Jays. On May 5, 1996, he was released by the Blue Jays, and the following day he signed as a free agent with the Phillies. He batted .313 for the Phillies that year with a .380 on-base percentage.

In eight seasons in the major leagues, Amaro appeared in 485 games, batting .235 with 16 home runs and 100 RBIs. He played for both the 1993 NL champion Phillies and the 1995 AL champion Indians.

Post-playing career

Front office positions
He served as Assistant GM for the Phillies for 10 seasons, before being named GM. His first seven seasons were under Wade, followed by three under Gillick.

On November 1, 2008, the day after the Phillies’ second-ever Broad Street Parade, it was confirmed that Amaro was given a three-year contract to be the new Phillies GM, as well as Senior Vice-president.

In , with the Phillies pitchers struggling despite being the defending World Series title holders, he traded for Cliff Lee and signed free agent Pedro Martinez, who contributed to the Phillies' return run to the World Series. In , Amaro traded for Roy Halladay but also dealt away Lee. In late July, when the Phillies were  games behind the Atlanta Braves, he pulled off yet another crafty trade, acquiring Roy Oswalt and "triggering a late-season blitz to baseball's best record." Prior to the  season, Amaro managed to convince Lee – then a free agent courting interest from the Texas Rangers and New York Yankees – to re-sign with the Phillies, joining a pitching rotation consisting of Halladay, Oswalt, Cole Hamels, and Joe Blanton. Commentators called it one of the best rotations ever assembled. Halladay, Oswalt, Lee, and Hamels were dubbed the 'Phantastic Phour' by fans and the media.

In July , a "Stay Or Go" poll was conducted by Philly.com with over 10,000 fans involved, and 93.6% of voters wanted Amaro to be removed from his position, with only 6.4% wanting Amaro to remain GM.

Amaro's performance with the Phillies was unlike that of his predecessor; in May , Sporting News ranked Amaro the worst general manager in MLB, noting his propensity to signing aging veterans who fail to perform at a level commensurate with their contracts. With the writing clearly on the wall for some time, Amaro was let go by the Phillies on September 10, 2015.

Following the  season, the Mets promoted Amaro from the coaching ranks into a front-office advisory role, under new GM Brodie Van Wagenen.

Coaching career

Amaro was hired as first base coach by the Red Sox for the  season, returning to the field for the first time since retiring as a player. Following the  season, he was named the Mets’ first base coach under new manager Mickey Callaway. He was then a special assistant to general manager Brodie Van Wagenen.

Media analyst
In 2020, he was hired as a pre-game and post-game television analyst for NBC Sports Philadelphia, covering the Phillies. He also does color commentary for some games.

Honors and awards
In 2008, Amaro was one of three people inducted into the All-American Amateur Baseball Association Hall of Fame.

In 2009, Amaro was inducted into the Philadelphia Jewish Sports Hall of Fame.

That same year, baseball fans nationwide voted him the MLB "This Year in Baseball Awards" 2009 Executive of the Year.

Also in 2009, the Philadelphia Sports Writers Association (PSWA) named him its Executive of the Year.

Philanthropy
Amaro is co-founder of the Richie Ashburn Harry Kalas Foundation, which provides baseball camps for underprivileged children in the Delaware Valley. He also serves on the local YMCA board in Philadelphia.

In popular culture
A teenage Amaro (portrayed by Niko Guardado, son of Major League baseball player, Eddie Guardado) is a recurring minor character in the ABC series The Goldbergs, which is set in the 1980s. Amaro attended the same school as television and film producer Adam F. Goldberg, on whose adolescence the show is based. Amaro portrayed his own father in Season 5, Episode 11 and reprised the role in Season 6, Episode 6.

See also

List of second-generation Major League Baseball players
List of select Jewish baseball players

References

Further reading

External links

Rubén Amaro Jr at SABR (Baseball Biography Project)
Rubén Amaro Jr at Baseball Almanac

1965 births
Living people
Águilas del Zulia players
American baseball players of Mexican descent
American expatriate baseball players in Canada
American people of Mexican-Jewish descent
American people of Russian-Jewish descent
American sportspeople of Cuban descent
Baseball players from Philadelphia
Boston Red Sox coaches
California Angels players
Cleveland Indians players
Cotuit Kettleers players
Edmonton Trappers players
Jewish American baseball coaches
Jewish American baseball players
Jewish Major League Baseball players
Major League Baseball center fielders
Major League Baseball first base coaches
Major League Baseball general managers
Major League Baseball right fielders
New York Mets coaches
New York Mets executives
Philadelphia Phillies executives
Philadelphia Phillies players
Stanford Cardinal baseball players
Tiburones de La Guaira players
American expatriate baseball players in Venezuela
William Penn Charter School alumni
Philadelphia Phillies announcers
21st-century American Jews